Chicago, Burlington Northern and Quincy Depot, also known as the Red Oak Burlington Northern Depot and WWII Memorial Museum, is a historic train depot located in Red Oak, Iowa, United States.  The city of Red Oak was established by the Burlington and Missouri River Railroad as Red Oak Junction.  That railroad was acquired by the Chicago, Burlington and Quincy Railroad, and they laid out a new right-of-way in southwest Iowa in the late 19th century to lessen the grade.  It required a new depot in Red Oak, which was built from 1900 to 1903. 

The single story, red brick structure is located on an embankment alongside the elevated tracks on the south side of town. Passenger service ended in 1971, and the railroad sought to demolish the depot in 1993. It was donated to the community in 1995, and added to the National Register of Historic Places in 1999.

The restored Burlington Northern Depot is now home to the WWII Memorial Museum, with exhibits relating to people from Montgomery County, Iowa who served in World War II, as well as country life on the home front on farms, factories, communities and household life. There are also displays about area railroad history.  

The museum is OPEN 10 am to 12 noon, Monday thru Friday, March thru December, and by appointment anytime.

References

External links

 NP Gallery Digital Asset Management System - National Register of Historic Places, Registration # 99000489
 Burlington Northern Depot & WWII Memorial Museum - official site

Railway stations in the United States opened in 1903
Railway stations closed in 1971
Former railway stations in Iowa
Victorian architecture in Iowa
Red Oak, Iowa
Railway stations on the National Register of Historic Places in Iowa
National Register of Historic Places in Montgomery County, Iowa
Red Oak
Museums in Montgomery County, Iowa
Military and war museums in Iowa
Railroad museums in Iowa